Lysidice is a plant genus in the subfamily Detarioideae. The two known species occur in East and Southeast Asia.

References

External links

Detarioideae
Fabaceae genera